Sparq may refer to:

 SPARQL, programming language
 SPARQCode, standard encoding for the contents of a QR barcode
 SPARQ Training, creators of a standardized test for athleticism
 SyQuest SparQ drive, a short-lived (1998–1999) removable-disk hard drive

See also
 Spark (disambiguation)